Oscar Dean (30 April 1886 – 11 May 1962) was an Australian cricketer. He played one first-class match for New South Wales in 1907/08.

See also
 List of New South Wales representative cricketers

References

External links
 

1886 births
1962 deaths
Australian cricketers
New South Wales cricketers
Cricketers from Sydney